The Control Council Law No. 1 – Repealing of Nazi Laws (short form: Kontrollratsgesetz Nr. 1) was a law enacted by the Allied Control Council for post-World War II Germany on 20 September 1945.

Description 
It repealed numerous pieces of legislation enacted by the Nazi regime. Also, it prohibited the application of any German enactment that could discriminate against any person based on their race, nationality, religious beliefs or opposition against the NSDAP.

By repealing the Enabling Act of 1933, theoretically the Weimar Constitution was reestablished, however the constitution stayed irrelevant on the grounds of the powers of the Allied Control Council acting as occupying forces.

Further denazification of the legislation was conduced the following years.

Text 
The official text of the law was in the three languages of the occupying forces, although a non-binding German translation was provided. Signatories for the occupying forces were Bernard L. Montgomery (British), Louis Koeltz (French), Vassily Sokolovsky (Soviet) and Dwight D. Eisenhower (American).

Fate of this law 
In the Federal Republic of Germany the law became defunct with the First Law for Repealing Occupying Forces Legislation (Erstes Gesetz zur Aufhebung des Besatzungsrechts) (BGBl. I p. 437) on 30 May 1955, with the previously repealed Nazi legislation staying invalid.

For the German Democratic Republic, the Council of Ministers of the Soviet Union repealed the law on 20 September 1955.

Explicitly repealed laws 
 Law to Remedy the Distress of People and Reich (Enabling Act) 24 March 1933 (RGBl. I S. 41),
 Law for the Reconstitution of Officialdom. April 7, 1933 (RGBl. I p. 175),
 Law for the amendment of the Provisions of Criminal Law and Procedure 24 April 1934 (RGBl. I p. 341),
 Law for the Protection of National Symbols 19 May 1933 (RGBl. I p. 285),
 Law Against the Formation of Parties 14 July 1933 (RGBl. I S. 479),
 Law on Plebiscites 14 July 1933 (RGBl. I p. 479),
 Law for securing the Unity of Party and State 1 December 1933 (RGBl. I p. 1016),
 Law concerning insidious attacks against the State and the Party and for the protection of the Party Uniform and Insignia 20 December 1934 (RGBl. I p. 1269),
 Reich Flag Law of 15 September 1935 (RGBl. I p. 1145),
 Law for the Protection of German Blood and German Honour 15 September 1935 (RGBl. I p. 1146),
 Reich Citizen Law 15 September 1935 (RGBl. I p. 1146),
 Prussian Law concerning the Gestapo 10 February 1936 (PreußGS. p. 21),
 Hitler Youth Law 1 December 1936 (RGBl. I p. 933),
 Ordinance against support for the Camouflaging of Jewish Businesses 22 April 1938 (RGBl. I S. 404),
 Ordinance for the Reporting of Property of Jews 26 April 1938 (RGBl. I p. 414),
 Law concerning the alteration of the trade regulations for the Reich 6 July 1938 (RGBl. I p. 823),
 Second Carrying Out Ordinance of the Law concerning the changing of Family Names and Christian Names 17 August 1938 (RGBl. I p. 1044),
 Ordinance concerning the Passports of Jews 5 October 1938 (RGBl. I p. 1342),
 Ordinance for the elimination of Jews from economic life 12 November 1938 (RGBl. I p. 1580),
 Police Ordinance concerning the appearance of Jews in Public 28 November 1938 (RGBl. I p. 1676),
 Ordinance concerning proof of German descent 1 August 1940 (RGBl. I p. 1063),
 Police Ordinance concerning the marking of Jews 1 September 1941 (RGBl. I p. 547),
 Ordinance concerning the employment of Jews  3 October 1941 (RGBl. I p. 675),
 Decree of the Führer concerning the legal status of the NSDAP 12 December 1942 (RGBl. I p. 733),
 Police Ordinance concerning the identification of male and female workers from the East on Reich Territory 19 June 1944 (RGBl. I p. 147).

Implicitly repealed laws 
 Law concerning the repealment of Naturalisation and revocation of German Citizenship 14 July 1933 (RGBl. I S. 480),
 Law concerning the Admission to the Bar 7 April 1933 (RGBl. I S. 188).

References

External links 
 Full text of Control Council Law No 1 on Wikisource
 Kontrollratsgesetz Nr. 1 
 

1945 in Germany
1945 in law
Law of Germany
Allied occupation of Germany